U.S. Route 6 (US 6) is a part of the United States Numbered Highway System that runs from Bishop, California, to Provincetown, Massachusetts. In Ohio, the road runs west–east from the Indiana state line near Edgerton to the Pennsylvania state line near Andover. The  that lie in Ohio are maintained by the Ohio Department of Transportation (ODOT). US 6 serves the major cities of Sandusky, Lorain, and Cleveland. The highway is also called the Grand Army of the Republic Highway to honor the Union forces of the U.S. Civil War. The alternate name was designated in 1953.

US 6 originally ran from Massachusetts to Pennsylvania. It was extended through Ohio to Colorado in June 1931. The route of US 6 has remained largely unchanged since 1931.

Route description
US 6 traverses the far northern portion of Ohio, passing through 10 counties. The highway travels through largely farm and field country until it reaches Sandusky. After Sandusky, US 6 travels along the coast of Lake Erie until Cleveland. From Cleveland to the Pennsylvania state line, US 6 passes through mostly wooded land.

Western Ohio
US 6 crosses into Williams County at the Indiana state line between Butler, Indiana, and Edgerton. The highway goes east from the border, passing through the small town of Edgerton, where it has a brief concurrency with State Route 49 (SR 49). Continuing east through farm country, US 6 passes through Ridgeville Corners, until reaching Napoleon in Henry County, where it intersects US 24, starting a  concurrency. East of Napoleon, US 6 passes through McClure. Along this  stretch, the road crosses into Wood County. Just east of Bowling Green, US 6 has a  overlap with SR 199.

US 6 continues through rural country until it passes just north of Bradner. Here, the highway intersects US 23 at the Wood–Sandusky county line. In Sandusky County, US 6 passes through the small towns of Rollersville and Helena before reaching the city of Fremont. US 6 skirts the northern city limits of Fremont before turning northeast just east of Fremont.  from Fremont, US 6 crosses under I-80/I-90, but there is not an interchange between the highways.

Just east of this intersection, US 6 enters the city of Sandusky. US 6 passes through a largely residential part of Sandusky. Locally, the highway is also known as Tiffin Avenue, West Washington Street, Warren Street, and Cleveland Road West. Cedar Point is accessed from US 6. Southeast of Sandusky, US 6 passes Griffing Sandusky Airport near Fairview Lanes. As US 6 continues east through Erie County, it passes through the city of Huron, the communities of Mitiwanga and Beulah Beach, and the city of Vermilion before crossing into Lorain County. East of Vermilion, in Lorain County, US 6 enters the city of Lorain, the last major city before the highway reaches Cleveland. In Lorain, US 6 stays close to the Lake Erie shoreline and crosses the Black River on the Charles Berry Bridge, the second-largest bascule bridge in the world. East of Lorain, US 6 passes through Sheffield Lake and Avon Lake before crossing into Cuyahoga County.

Cleveland
After passing through Bay Village, US 6 enters the suburbs of Cleveland. In Rocky River, US 6 starts concurrencies with SR 2 and US 20.

US 6 enters the city of Cleveland during its overlap with SR 2 and US 20. US 6, along with US 20, splits from SR 2 just before it crosses the Cuyahoga River on the Main Avenue Bridge. US 6 meets up with SR 3 and US 42 at West 25th Street, and the four highways (US 6, US 20, US 42, and SR 3) cross the Cuyahoga River on the Detroit–Superior Bridge. At the east end of the bridge, US 6 passes through Public Square. Here, the concurrencies with US 20, US 42, and SR 3 end.

East of Public Square, US 6 has an interchange with I-90. After splitting from US 20, US 6 runs concurrent with SR 84 for  before entering Lake County.

Eastern Ohio
The  that lie within Lake County pass through many small residential developments in Willoughby Hills and Kirtland before crossing into Geauga County. In Geauga County, US 6 passes through the city of Chardon, where it has a brief overlap with SR 44. In Chardon, US 6 turns northeast to serve Hambden and Montville townships before crossing into Ashtabula County.

In Ashtabula County, US 6 travels straight east through the townships of Hartsgrove, Rome, New Lyme, and Cherry Valley, as well as the village of Andover before turning north with SR 7.

History
US 6 was one of the original routes created when the U.S. Numbered Highway System was formed. Originally, US 6 was only routed from Provincetown, Massachusetts, to Brewster, New York. Soon after, it was routed to Pennsylvania and was alternatively named the Roosevelt Highway. The route was not extended into Ohio until 1931, when the highway was expanded to Greeley, Colorado. The Ohio routing established in 1931 has not been changed since then.

By the 1930s, the Roosevelt Highway name had started to fade. Major William Anderson Jr. took notice of this and proposed the idea of redesignating the highway to honor Union forces during the Civil War. Veteran associations started promoting the idea in 1934. Because each state along the highway owned its portion of US 6, each state had to act on the proposal. Each state had approved the renaming by 1953, and it was in that year that US 6 was designated as the Grand Army of the Republic Highway along its entire length. The name is signed in all 14 states that US 6 passes through.

Major intersections

See also

References

External links

 Ohio
Transportation in Ohio
06
Transportation in Williams County, Ohio
Transportation in Henry County, Ohio
Transportation in Wood County, Ohio
Transportation in Sandusky County, Ohio
Transportation in Erie County, Ohio
Transportation in Lorain County, Ohio
Transportation in Cuyahoga County, Ohio
Transportation in Lake County, Ohio
Transportation in Geauga County, Ohio
Transportation in Ashtabula County, Ohio
Transportation in Cleveland
Lorain, Ohio